R. M. Vasagam (Ramaswamy Manicka Vasagam) is a veteran space scientist from India and a specialist in space systems including satellites and launch vehicles. In his career spanning close to three decades in the Indian Space Research Organisation, he held responsibilities including the Project Director for APPLE— India's first indigenous geostationary communication satellite project, and later the Director of the Advanced Technology and Planning at the ISRO Headquarters. He was later the Vice Chancellor of Anna University and is currently the Chancellor of Dr. M.G.R. Educational and Research Institute.

Early life 
After graduating from PSG College of Technology in 1963, he completed his Master of Engineering in Electrical Engineering from Indian Institute of Technology Madras in 1965.

Career 
Vasagam joined India's space program in 1965 while it was still Indian National Committee for Space Research. While at ISRO, he worked across functions including launch, planning and evaluation group, control systems, satellite center and advanced technology and planning. He was the Project Director for India's first indigenous geostationary communication satellite project, APPLE during 1977–1983. In 1994, he took over as the Director, Directorate of Advanced Technology and Planning, ISRO Headquarters, Bangalore.

During 1996–1999, he was the Vice Chancellor of Anna University, Chennai. He was later the Chairman of Tamil Nadu Institute of Information Technology Chennai (June 1999–Oct 2001), and Director (IT) at Karunya Institute of Technology and Sciences, Coimbatore. He also held the post of Vice Chancellor (June, 2003-Apr, 2006) and Pro -Chancellor (Apr 2006–Sep 2008) at Dr. M.G.R. Educational and Research Institute. Vasagam currently is the Chancellor, Dr. M.G.R. Educational and Research Institute and Karpagam University Coimbatore. 

His other areas of interest include self-reliance in space systems, reusable launch vehicles and serviceable satellites.

Awards 

 Hari Om Ashram Prerit Vikram Sarabhai Research Award, 1981, by PRL, Department of Space, Govt. of India.
 Padma Shri, 1982 by the Govt. of India.
 IEEE Centennial Medal, Bangalore Section, 1984 IEEE.

References

Living people
Indian Space Research Organisation people
Tamil scientists
Year of birth missing (living people)